The Whites was the name given to pan-Serbian and Yugoslavist activists in Montenegro during and after the declaration of the Podgorica Assembly in November 1918. The Podgorica Assembly allowed the Montenegrin people to vote on the fate of the Kingdom of Montenegro. The two options were for the Kingdom of Montenegro to join the Kingdom of Serbia through an annexation-based unification or through a confederation-based unification. The name of the Whites derived from the "White List", as opposed to the "Green List", from where the Greens took their name from. The Assembly ended with overwhelming support for annexation-based unification. The movement was led by Marko Daković, Andrija Radović and Ljubomir Vuksanović. The two opposing sides clashed in the short-lived Christmas Uprising of 1919.

References

Sources 

 

Serbian nationalism in Montenegro
Political history of Montenegro
Montenegro–Serbia relations
Defunct political parties in Montenegro
20th century in Montenegro
Serb political parties in Montenegro